Rayakottai, also spelled Rayakotta is a town in Denkanikottai taluk, Krishnagiri District, Tamil Nadu, India.

Rayakottai fort
It is now one of the protected monuments by the Archaeological Survey of India. In the 18th century Hyder Ali and Tipu sultan ruled from this fort. The fort was captured by Major Gowdie during the third Anglo-Mysore War in 1791. According to the Treaty of Srirangapatna, this fort came into the hands of the British.

Transport
The nearest airport is Bangalore International Airport
The nearest railway station is Rayakottai railway station
The nearest bus stand is Rayakottai Bus Stand

Gallery

References

2.Government's Krishnagiri District website
 
3.

Cities and towns in Krishnagiri district